Ashot Rafailovich Khachaturyants (born May 25, 1968, Kislovodsk, Stavropol Krai, RSFSR, USSR) is a Russian football functionary, vice president and member of the bureau of the executive committee of the Russian Football Union, and president of the Russian Premier League.

Biography 
Ashot was born in Kislovodsk in the Stavropol Krai in May 1968.

In 1991 he completed his studies at the Gubkin Moscow Oil and Gas Institute and in the same year began working for the Gazxport company, a subsidiary of the Gazprom Corporation. He was later appointed as Chairman of the "Siderca" Group, an Argentine company that engaged in the oil business and was later acquired by the Japanese. During the 90s he lived and worked in Buenos Aires. In later interview, after becaming President of the Russian Premier League, he revealed himself as strong supporter of the Argentine Football.

In 2001 he was appointed Chairman of the Investment Policy Department in the Russian Ministry of Economic Development, until 2004. During that time he served as an adviser to the Minister of Economic Development, Herman Gref.

In 2004, he was surprisingly appointed as  head of the Federal Security Service's Federal Border Administration Program. As part of his work he was entrusted with strengthening the Russian border in the North Caucasus region. The position was offered to him by Vladimir Pronichev, then Director of the Federal Border Service and who later became chairman of the board of directors of the Dynamo Sports Club.

After Herman Graf was appointed CEO of Sberbank, he offered Khachaturyants a position as CEO of Sberbank Capital, a subsidiary of Sberbank and in this position he served from 2008 to 2021. He also served as a member of the board of directors in Russneft (ОАО «НК« РуссНефть).

From April 2020 to July 2021, he was appointed President of the holding company Eurocement group and was also a member of the board of trustees in the State Tretyakov Gallery.

In November 2019 he was appointed to manage the Referees Committee of the Russian Football Union and also was Head of the Expert Referees Committee, under the Union's President Alexander Dyukov. Due to this he was became a member of the committee for the football development program in the board of directors of the Russian Football Union.

In October 2021 he was appointed as acting President of the Russian Premier League, replacing Sergey Pryadkin who resigned.

References

External links
Ashot Khachaturyants elected as president of Russia’s football Premier League, TASS

People of the Federal Security Service
Russian sports executives and administrators
Russian business executives
Sberbank of Russia
Russian football chairmen and investors
1968 births
Living people
Gubkin Russian State University of Oil and Gas